Willemijn is a Dutch feminine given name. The name originated as a feminine form of the masculine Willem, which is the Dutch version of the Germanic name Wilhelm. Wilhelm can be literally translated as wil meaning "willful" or "strong" and helm meaning "helmet", and is often interpreted as meaning "fierce helmet" or "fierce protector". The name is most common in the Netherlands but is also present in other Dutch-speaking countries, or countries with Dutch populations or heritage.

Notable people
Willemijn Bos (Born 1988), Dutch field hockey defender
Willemijn Duyster (Born 1970), Dutch field hockey defender and Olympic medalist
Willemijn Fock (1942-2021), Dutch art historian
Willemijn Posthumus-van der Goot (1897-1989), Dutch economist
Willemijn Verkaik (Born 1975), Dutch singer and actress
Willemijn Verloop (Born 1970), Dutch peace activist and founder of War Child

See also
Willem

References

Given names
Dutch feminine given names